The Blanche Marie Falls (Dutch: Blanche Marievallen) is one of the largest waterfalls of Suriname. The falls are located on the Nickerie River.

Van Drimmelen named the falls after his wife. The falls are a popular tourist destination and can be reached by car via the Southern East-West Link.

Notes

Waterfalls of Suriname